Mil Aghardan (also Romanized as Mīl Āghārdān and Mīlāghārdān; also known as Miragarden) is a village in Sanjabad-e Sharqi Rural District, in the Central District of Khalkhal County, Ardabil Province, Iran. At the 2006 census, its population was 29, in 6 families.

References 

Towns and villages in Khalkhal County